Winchell is a 1998 American biographical drama television film directed by Paul Mazursky and written by Scott Abbott, based on the 1976 book Winchell, His Life and Times by Herman Klurfeld. It stars Stanley Tucci as Walter Winchell, with Glenne Headly, Paul Giamatti, Xander Berkeley, Kevin Tighe, and Christopher Plummer in supporting roles.

The film won three Primetime Emmy Awards, including Outstanding Lead Actor in a Miniseries or Movie for Tucci, who also received a Golden Globe Award and a Screen Actors Guild Award nomination for his performance.

Premise
The film follows Walter Winchell from his early days as a tabloid gossip columnist to his rise as he takes on the United States' most powerful propagandist.

Cast
 Stanley Tucci as Walter Winchell
 Glenne Headly as Dallas Wayne
 Paul Giamatti as Herman Klurfeld
 Xander Berkeley as Gavreau
 Kevin Tighe as William Randolph Hearst
 Christopher Plummer as Franklin D. Roosevelt
 Frank Medrano as Melvin Diamond
 Vic Polizos as Sam Hague
 John F. O'Donohue as Harry
 Michael Greene as Bellamy
 Rod McCary as Emcee
 Victoria Platt as Josephine Baker
 Paula Cale as Mrs. Klurfeld
 Jason Huber as Ed Sullivan
 Paul Jenkins as Lawrence Newman
 Paul Mazursky as Winchell's Father
 Megan Mullally as June Winchell
 Mary Portser as Janet Winchell

Awards and nominations

Notes

References

External links
 

1998 films
1998 drama films
1998 television films
1990s biographical drama films
American biographical drama films
Biographical television films
American drama television films
1990s English-language films
Biographical films about journalists
Biographical films about radio people
Cultural depictions of Franklin D. Roosevelt
Cultural depictions of Josephine Baker
Cultural depictions of William Randolph Hearst
Films about mass media owners
Films about media manipulation
Films about newspaper publishing
Films about tabloid journalism
Films based on biographies
Films directed by Paul Mazursky
Films scored by Bill Conti
Films set in New York City
Films shot in Los Angeles
Films shot in New York City
HBO Films films
Television films based on books
1990s American films